Derek Luke (born May 28, 1993) is an American professional soccer player who plays as a defender.

Career

Youth and college
Luke attended Bridgewater-Raritan High School and played four years of college soccer at Monmouth University between 2011 and 2015.

Professional
Luke was signed by new United Soccer League club FC Cincinnati on February 15, 2016.

Luke was released from FC Cincinnati on June 30, 2017.

Luke signed with Rio Grande Valley FC for the 2018 season.

References

External links 
 

1993 births
Living people
American soccer players
Monmouth Hawks men's soccer players
Central Jersey Spartans players
FC Cincinnati (2016–18) players
Rio Grande Valley FC Toros players
Association football defenders
Soccer players from New Jersey
USL League Two players
USL Championship players
Bridgewater-Raritan High School alumni
People from Bridgewater Township, New Jersey
Sportspeople from Somerset County, New Jersey